Dorcadion praetermissum is a species of beetle in the family Cerambycidae. It was described by Pesarini and Sabbadini in 1998. It is known from Turkey.

Subspecies
 Dorcadion praetermissum mikhaili Ozdikmen, 2010
 Dorcadion praetermissum praetermissum Pesarini & Sabbadini, 1998

References

praetermissum
Beetles described in 1998